Praniti Praveen Kumar is an Indian playback singer from the state of Tamil Nadu. She has recorded songs for music albums and films in Tamil language and appeared at several movies.

Career 
She acted in the movie Aruvi as a child role of lead actress Aditi Balan in 2017. She sang a solo track for D. Imman which was her debut as play back singer under Red Giant production, UdhayaNidhi Stalin. She sang "Pappara Pappa" for the movie Lakshmi in Tamil and Telugu. Several of her cover songs have gone viral.
Praniti has a channel on YouTube called Praniti where she has over a million subscribers.

Filmography

References

External links 
 
 

Indian women playback singers
Singers from Tamil Nadu
Tamil playback singers
Musicians from Chennai
21st-century Indian women singers
21st-century Indian singers
Living people
21st-century Indian child actresses
Year of birth missing (living people)